Alexander (Sandy) Carson is a Canadian filmmaker.

Early life and education
Carson was born and raised in Ottawa, Ontario. He graduated from the Dramatic Arts program at Canterbury High School (Ottawa) before attending Concordia University's Mel Hoppenheim School of Cinema in Montreal, Quebec. Carson returned to Concordia for a master's degree in Film Studies in 2009. He received the Lotte Eisner Award upon graduation in 2011.

Career

Directing and producing

Alexander Carson is a founding member of the North Country Cinema media arts collective, along with filmmakers Kyle Thomas and Nicholas Martin, colleagues whom he met at film school in Montreal. As a writer/director, Carson has presented work at many major international festivals, including the Toronto International Film Festival.

Carson's films explore intimate, personal narratives and experimental approaches to visual storytelling. In 2012, he won the Award for Achievement In Direction from the Air Canada enRoute Film Festival for his film We Refuse To Be Cold.

In 2014, Carson received the Golden Gate Award for New Visions at the San Francisco International Film Festival for his film Numbers & Friends.

Later that year, Carson completed work on North Country Cinema's first feature film The Valley Below as a producer. Written and directed by longtime colleague and collaborator Kyle Thomas, the film premiered at the Toronto International Film Festival and went on to garner two Canadian Screen Award nominations in 2015.

Carson's first feature-length film as a writer/director, O, Brazen Age, premiered at the Vancouver International Film Festival in 2015. The film was subsequently selected for numerous other festivals in North America and Europe, including the Reykjavik International Film Festival.

Carson returned to VIFF in 2016 to premiere a short film entitled The New Canada. This film would be recognized with a Gold Bison Award at the Buffalo International Film Festival later that year. The New Canada was acquired by the Canadian Broadcasting Corporation in 2017.

Acting
Carson often performs in his own films, and frequently cites his appreciation for the work of amateur actors or "non-actors" in cinema. Carson performed the role of Mr. Oddi in Sheila Heti's play All Our Happy Days Are Stupid directed by Jordan Tannahill. The show was first presented at Videofag in 2013, before a larger remount at the Harbourfront Centre in Toronto and at The Kitchen in New York City in 2015. Carson was nominated for a Dora Mavor Moore Award in 2014 as part of the show's ensemble cast.

Filmography (as writer/director)
 2023: Alberta Number One
 2016: The New Canada
 2015: O, Brazen Age
 2013: Numbers & Friends
 2012: Braids
 2011: "We Refuse To Be Cold"
 2009: Last Communication With Laura
 2008: Lucy James part 1
 2005: Built Like Light

References

External links
 
 North Country Cinema Official Website

1982 births
Living people
Film producers from Ontario
Canadian male screenwriters
Concordia University alumni
English-language film directors
Film directors from Ottawa
Male actors from Ottawa
Writers from Ottawa
21st-century Canadian male actors
21st-century Canadian screenwriters